Roman Hubník (born 6 June 1984) is a retired Czech professional football defender. His career was connected especially with Sigma Olomouc, Viktoria Plzeň and Hertha BSC. Until 2016, he also played for the Czech national team. His brother Michal Hubník is also a footballer.

Club career
In January 2007, FC Moscow signed Hubník from SK Sigma Olomouc for a €2 million transfer fee. In January 2009 he was loaned out until 31 December 2009 to Sparta Prague. After his return to Russia, he again moved on loan, this time to Hertha BSC. On 20 May 2010, Hertha made use of a contract option and signed Hubník permanently. In September 2013, he signed a deal with Viktoria Plzeň.

International career
Hubník played for all Czech national youth teams. On 5 July 2009, Hubník made his debut for the Czech Republic national team in the match against Malta. His first international goal came on 12 August 2009, in the 3–1 victory over Belgium.
At the European championship in 2016 in France, Hubník played in all three group-stage matches for the Czech national team. With only one point from the three games, the team did not qualify for the knockout stages.

Career statistics

International

International goals

References

External links
 
 
 
 
 

1984 births
Living people
People from Vsetín
Czech footballers
Czech Republic youth international footballers
Czech Republic under-21 international footballers
Czech Republic international footballers
Czech expatriate footballers
Czech expatriate sportspeople in Germany
Czech expatriate sportspeople in Russia
Expatriate footballers in Germany
Expatriate footballers in Russia
Association football defenders
Czech First League players
Bundesliga players
2. Bundesliga players
Russian Premier League players
SK Sigma Olomouc players
FC Moscow players
AC Sparta Prague players
Hertha BSC players
UEFA Euro 2012 players
UEFA Euro 2016 players
Sportspeople from the Zlín Region